Tramping Lake is a village in the Canadian province of Saskatchewan within the Rural Municipality of Tramping Lake No. 380 and Census Division No. 13. The village gets its name from nearby Tramping Lake, which is a lake along the course of Eagle Creek.

History 
Tramping Lake incorporated as a village on April 10, 1917.

Demographics 

See also 

 List of communities in Saskatchewan
 Villages of Saskatchewan

Footnotes

Villages in Saskatchewan
Tramping Lake No. 380, Saskatchewan
Division No. 13, Saskatchewan